Țîbuleuca (Tsybulivka, Tsybulyovka) is a village in the Dubăsari District of Transnistria, Moldova. It has since 1990 been administered as a part of the breakaway Pridnestrovian Moldavian Republic (PMR).

Notable people
 Ion Solonenco (1935–2022), brigadier general in the Moldovan Ground Forces

References

External links 
 

Villages of Transnistria
Baltsky Uyezd
Dubăsari District, Transnistria